The International Emmy Award for Best Arts Programming is presented by the International Academy of Television Arts & Sciences (IATAS) to the best arts programs produced and initially aired outside of the United States.

Rules and regulations 
Under the rules of the International Academy: arts programming is a program dedicated to an art form or artist(s) (i.e. performance, art documentary, art series, or combination thereof).

If the program is part of a continuous series of self-contained episodes (i.e. each episode has its own storyline with a conclusion; or each episode may have a different director and/or producer; or series has the potential to go on for multiple seasons), then each episode must be submitted as a separate entry. If the program is a multi-part series with a finite number of episodes (no further episodes planned), covering the same theme, two (2) episodes must be submitted to represent the series as a whole.

If the program contains multiple parts with a continuing storyline beyond one episode, or share the same concept, two (2) episodes must be submitted to represent the series as a whole. The program may employ partial re-enactment, stock footage, stills, animation, stop-motion or other techniques, as long as the emphasis is on fact and not on fiction.

Winners and nominees

2000s

2010s

2020s

See also
 List of International Emmy Award winners

References

External links
 2013 Emmy Awards
 International Emmy Awards

Arts